The Tauberbischofsheim Fencing Club (in German Fecht-Club Tauberbischofsheim eingetragener Verein; commonly known as FC Tauberbischofsheim e. V.) is a fencing club based in Tauberbischofsheim, Baden-Württemberg, Germany. Tauberbischofsheim fencers have earned more than 300 medals in international sporting events.

History

Prehistory
On 12 October 1954 – at the initiative of Emil Beck at the "Gasthaus zum Schwanen" – a fencing division in the Club TSV 1863 Tauberbischofsheim e.V. was founded. First trainings were held in the auditorium of the old high school, later in the gym of the high school and the newly built festival hall in Tauberbischofsheim. In 1955 the first public club tournament was in the "Gasthaus zur Bretze". In 1958 the first fencing piste was purchased.

Founding and construction of the Club
On June 30, 1967 the fencing division left the TSV 1863 Tauberbischofsheim. On 14 October 1967 the official founding meeting of the Fencing-Club Tauberbischofsheim took place in the "Raststätte Block". 1972 and 1976 new staff rooms, fencing arenas, boarding rooms and training rooms opened. In the same year Tauberbischofsheimer fencers won the first gold medals at Olympic Games. 1983 a new fencing hall was built with 18 fencing pistes and fitness rooms.

Founding of the Olympic team's training camp
1986 the Fencing-Club Tauberbischofsheim was part of a newly established Olympic team's training camp Tauberbischofsheim (in German Olympiastützpunkt (OSP) Tauberbischofsheim) for the sport of Fencing in Tauberbischofsheim. In 1988 the sport boarding school "Berghof" opened. 2002 the Vital-Centre was established.

Anniversaries
2007 the Fencing-Club Tauberbischofsheim committed its 40th anniversary and 2011 the 25th anniversary of the Olympic team's training camp Tauberbischofsheim was celebrated.

Honours
Over 380 medals at Olympic Games and Paralympics, World Championships and European Championships and over 655 medals at German National Championships emphasise the dominant position that the Fencing-Club Tauberbischofsheim holds within international fencing (point in time: June 2016):

Olympic Games and Paralympics
Medals of the Fencing-Club Tauberbischofsheim at Olympic Games and Paralympics:

World Championships
Medals of the Fencing-Club Tauberbischofsheim at World Championships:

Medals of the Fencing-Club Tauberbischofsheim at Junior World Championships:

Medals of the Fencing-Club Tauberbischofsheim at Cadet World Championships:

European Championships
Medals of the Fencing-Club Tauberbischofsheim at European Championships:

Medals of the Fencing-Club Tauberbischofsheim at Junior European Championships:

German National Championships
The fencers of the FC Tauberbischofsheim won 655 medals at German National Championships (point in time: 2012).

Outstanding personalities

Former Athletes
 Thomas Bach, a German former fencer and Olympic Champion, the ninth and current president of the IOC.
 Anja Fichtel, is a German fencer, 14-time medalist at Olympic Games and World Fencing Championships, Winner of the Silver Laurel Leaf, Voted "female fencer of the 20th century".
 Alexander Pusch, several time medalist at Olympic Games and World Championships, Winner of the Silver Laurel Leaf, Voted "male fencer of the 20th century".

Former Coaches
 Emil Beck, "Founding father" of the Fencing-Club Tauberbischofsheim, a German fencing coach who created a school of fencing sometimes referred to as the "German school" since Beck's influence on German fencing was profound. As a fencing coach, Beck was largely self-taught. Considering Becks medal success, he is one of the most successful coaches in the world (163 medals at Olympic Games, World Championships and European Championships). Beck coined the reputation of the Fencing-Club Tauberbischofsheim in the 1970s as "Tauberbischofsheimer goldsmith" and "Mecca of fencing".

Medallists
The following fencers – who started for the Fencing-Club Tauberbischofsheim – won gold, silver and bronze medals at Olympic Games, Paralympics, World Championships and European Championships (point in time: October 2015):

A
Norman Ackermann, Christian Adrians.
B
Thomas Bach, Sebastian Bachmann, Maria Bartkowski, Uwe Bartmann, Sabine Bau, Simone Bauer, Frank Beck, Thorsten Becker, Manfred Beckmann, Dominik Behr, Matthias Behr, Reinhold Behr, Elmar Beierstettel, Reinhard Berger, Sandra Bingenheimer, Elke Birthelmer, Sabine Bischoff, Claudia Bokel, Elmar Borrmann, Rico Braun.
C
Roman Christen, Beate Christmann.
D
Annette Dobmeier, Annekathrin Donath.
E
Leonie Ebert, Ulrich Eifler, Thomas Endres, Stephanie Eim.
F
Robert Felisiak, Anja Fichtel-Mauritz, Jörg Fiedler, Volker Fischer, Michael Flegler, Sebastian Flegler, Tobias Frank, Zita Funkenhauser, Hedwig Funkenhauser.
G
Stefanie Geiger, Michael Gerull, Thomas Gerull, Mathias Gey, Karin Gießelmann, Carolin Golubytskyi, Matthias Grimm.
H
Yvonne Haag, Viola Haenlein, Doreen Häntzsch, Gerhard Heer, Jürgen Hehn, Harald Hein, Isabell Hertlein, Denis Holzkamp, Stefan Hörger, Björn Hübner, Jacek Huchwajda, Rosalia Huszti.
J
Hanns Jana.
K
Barbara Kasperska, Wolfgang Kempf, Martin Kindt, Johannes Klebes, Benjamin Kleibrink, Annette Klug, Jochen Knies, Johannes Kobsik, Susanne König, Rita König, Melanie Kura.
L
Susanne Lang, Tobias Link, Wilfried Lipinski, Carsten Lotter, Gudrun Lotter, Natascha Lotter.
M
Maximilian Mutze.
N
Carolin Neckermann, Rafael Nickel.
O
Patrycia Osyczkav.
P
Alexander Pusch.
R
Jan-Erich Rauhaus, Markus Reiter, Wladimir Reznitschenko, Hannah Roder, Uwe Römer, Alexander Rüdinger, Luisa Ruppert.
S
Anja Schache, Lars Schache, Ute Schaeper, Gesine Schiel, Sven Schmid, Arnd Schmitt, Ulrich Schmitt, Martin Schmitt, Ulrich Schreck, Silke Schwarz, Erk Sens-Gorius, Etelka Sike, Waltraut Stollwerck, Daniel Strigel, Mariusz Strzalka.
U
Samuel Unterhauser.
W
Katja Wächter, Udo Wagner, Alexander Weber, Esther Weber, Thorsten Weidner, Benjamin Weinkauf, Ingo Weißenborn, Martin Wendel, André Weßels, Steffen Wiesinger, Rhena Wolf.
Z
Boris Zorc.

Media
The Fencing-Club Tauberbischofsheim uses the following communication channels to publish its informations: a website, a Facebook page and a YouTube channel.

Further reading
 Richard Möll: Die Fecht-Legende von Tauberbischofsheim. Laub Verlag, Elztal 1987, .
 Emil Beck: Tauberbischofsheimer Fechtlektionen für Anfänger und Fortgeschrittene. Philippka Verlag, Münster 1987, .
 Deutscher Fechter-Bund, Andreas Schirmer: En Garde! Allez! Touché!: 100 Jahre Fechten in Deutschland – eine Erfolgsgeschichte. Meyer Verlag, Aachen 2011, .

References

External links

 Website of the Fencing-Club Tauberbischofsheim
 Website of the Olympic team's training camp Tauberbischofsheim
 

Sports clubs in Germany
Fencing in Germany
Main-Tauber-Kreis
1954 establishments in Germany